Aleksander Liiber (1884 Sõmerpalu Parish (now Võru Parish), Kreis Werro – ?) was an Estonian politician. He was a member of II Riigikogu. He was a member of the Riigikogu since 25 April 1924. He replaced Eduard Kingsepp. On 17 May 1924, he was removed from his position and he was replaced by Jaan Vaher.

References

1884 births
Year of death missing
People from Võru Parish
People from Kreis Werro
Workers' United Front politicians
Members of the Riigikogu, 1923–1926